Kathleen K. Parker (born September 21, 1943) is an American politician.

Parker was born in Pittsburgh, Pennsylvania. She received her bachelor's degree from the University of Florida. Parker lived in Northbrook, Illinois with her husband and family. Parker served in the Illinois Senate from 1995 until 2002 and was a Republican.

Notes

1943 births
Living people
Politicians from Pittsburgh
People from Northbrook, Illinois
University of Miami alumni
Women state legislators in Illinois
Republican Party Illinois state senators
21st-century American women